Popovljane is a settlement in the Suva Reka municipality in the disputed region of Kosovo, southern Serbia. The rural settlement lies on a cadastral area with the same name, with 259 hectares. It lies 796 m above sea level. It has an ethnic Serb majority; in the 1991 census, it had 161 inhabitants.

The first mention of this village is from 1465. At the end of the 19th century, the Russian consul in Prizren mentioned this village and its rural church, which was inhabited by Serbs. The Russian consulate tried to prevent the violence by Albanians from a neighbouring village who did not allow the Popovljanians to have their Orthodox ceremonies in that church. In the Popovljane cemetery there is a Church dedicated to St. Nicholas, founded in 1626.

There is a primary school in the village.

Notes

References

Villages in Suva Reka
Serbian enclaves in Kosovo